Lieutenant Colonel (retd) Sultan Mohammed Khan Mengal (1918 – 2021) was the oldest Pakistan Army veteran. He joined the British Indian Army in 1941 and was commissioned in the 5th Baluch (Jacob Regiment) in 1942. Following the independence of Pakistan, he joined Pakistan Army and retired as a Lieutenant Colonel in 1967. He died on 26 September 2021 in Quetta and was 103 years old at the time of his death.

Personal life
Sultan Mengal was born in November 1918.

Military career
Sultan Mengal started his military career by joining the British Indian Army in 1941 and got a commission in the 5th Baluch (Jacob Regiment) in 1942. After the independence of Pakistan, he joined Pakistan Army's Frontier Force Regiment and also served as the instructor at Infantry School Quetta. He also served as the commandant of the Khyber Rifles, 2FF Guides, Sutlej Rangers, Northern Scouts Gilgit. He retired in 1967 from Pakistan Army as a Lieutenant Colonel.

Death
Sultan Mengal died at the age of 103 in Combined Military Hospital in the city of Quetta on 26 September 2021. Pakistan military spokesman, Major General Babar Iftikhar, expressed his condolences on the demise of Sultan Mohammed Khan Mengal and described him as "a keen soldier and adventurist who had climbed, walked, skied, sailed and rowed through all of the country’s natural terrain on many expeditions".

References

1918 births
2021 deaths
Baloch people
Indian Army personnel of World War II
British Indian Army officers
Pakistan Army personnel
Pakistani centenarians
Men centenarians
People from Quetta